Comptosia quadripennis is a species of bee flies in the family Bombyliidae.

References

Bombyliidae
Insects described in 1848
Insects of Australia
Taxa named by Pierre-Justin-Marie Macquart